Brigadier general Edward Stevenson Browne, VC, CB (23 December 1852 – 16 July 1907) was a British Army officer, and an English recipient of the Victoria Cross, the highest and most prestigious award for gallantry in the face of the enemy that can be awarded to British and Commonwealth forces.

Early career
Browne was commissioned a second lieutenant in the 24th Regiment of Foot (later The South Wales Borderers) on 23 September 1871, and promoted to lieutenant on 28 October 1871.

Victoria cross Details
He was 26 years old, and a lieutenant in the 1st Battalion, 24th Regiment of Foot during the Anglo-Zulu War when the following deed took place on 29 March 1879 at the battle of Hlobane, South Africa for which he was awarded the VC:

Later career
Browne was promoted to captain on 19 May 1880, to major on 2 November 1885, to lieutenant-colonel on 8 April 1893, and to colonel on 8 April 1897. He was in command of the South Wales Borderers Regimental District until 4 March 1900, when he was appointed an Assistant Adjutant General of the North-Eastern District, stationed at York. He went on to be General Officer Commanding North Eastern District (with the temporary rank of brigadier-general) from 4 September 1902, before retiring in November 1903 with the substantive rank of brigadier-general. He also commanded the West-Yorkshire Volunteer Brigade, and in December 1902 was appointed to the Honorary Colonelcy of the 2nd volunteer battalion (Bradford Rifles) of The Prince of Wales Own Regiment of Yorkshire.

The medal
His Victoria Cross is displayed at the Regimental Museum of The Royal Welsh, Brecon, Powys, Wales.

References

Further reading
Monuments to Courage (David Harvey, 1999)
The Register of the Victoria Cross (This England, 1997)

British Army brigadiers
Military personnel from Cambridgeshire
British recipients of the Victoria Cross
Companions of the Order of the Bath
1852 births
1907 deaths
Anglo-Zulu War recipients of the Victoria Cross
South Wales Borderers officers
People from Cambridge
British Army personnel of the Anglo-Zulu War
British Army recipients of the Victoria Cross